Find Me in Your Memory is a 2020 South Korean television series starring Kim Dong-wook and Moon Ga-young. It aired on MBC TV from March 18 to May 13, 2020.

Synopsis
A love story between a man who remembers every second of his life and a woman who forgot her painful past to live.

Lee Jung-Hoon works as an anchorman at a broadcasting station. He has hyperthymesia, a condition that allows him to remember nearly every moment in his life. Meanwhile, Yeo Ha-Jin is a top actress. She has forgotten her past. Due to this, she lives as she pleases.

Cast

Main
 Kim Dong-wook as Lee Jung-hoon, anchorman for Live News who is loved for exposing his guests' wrongdoings.
 Moon Ga-young as Yeo Ha-jin, a model-turned-actress who is recognized as a power influencer.

Supporting

People around Jung-hoon
 Cha Kwang-soo as Lee Dong-young, Jung-hoon's father who's a carpenter.
 Gil Hae-yeon as Seo Mi-hyun, a poet and Jung-hoon's mother.
 Lee Joo-bin as Jung Seo-yeon, a ballerina who was Jung-hoon's first love and girlfriend but then she died.
 Yoon Jong-hoon as Yoo Tae-eun, a neuropsychiatrist and Jung-hoon's best friend.

People around Ha-jin
 Kim Seul-gi as Yeo Ha-kyung, Ha-jin's little sister and manager.
 Lee Soo-mi as Park Kyung-ae, the CEO of Ha-jin's agency.
 Shin Joo-hyup as Moon Cheol, Ha-jin's road manager.

People around Tae-eun
 Kim Chang-wan as Yoo Sung-hyuk, Tae-eun's father and a university professor who wrote a thesis on Jung-hoon's condition.
 Jang Yi-jung as Yoo Ji-won, Tae-eun's sister from his father's remarriage.
 Yoo Ji-soo as Jin So-young, Seong-hyeok's wife and Tae-eun's stepmother.

People at the Press Bureau
 Jang Young-nam as Choi Hee-sang, director of the news reporting bureau who is married to Cheol-woong.
 Lee Jin-hyuk as Jo Il-kwon, a newsroom reporter and Jung-hoon's junior colleague.
 Lee Seung-joon as Kim Cheol-woong, News Live director who is married to Hee-sang.

Others
 Ji Il-joo as Ji Hyun-geun, a movie director who helmed Ha-jin's film My First Love.
 Kwon Eun-soo as News Media Staff	.
 Jang In-sub as Park Soo-chang, a reporter.
 Kim Nam-hee as Drama Director.
 Park Ji-won as Kim Hee-young, a nurse.
 Joo Seok-tae as Moon Sung-ho, Seo-yeon's stalker.
 Han Da-mi as an assistant director.

Special appearances

 Park Sung-geun as Oh Taek-won (Ep. 1)
Chairman of Hwarang Department Store. During a live interview, Jung-hoon exposes him for abusing his personal assistant.
 Kim Seon-ho as Seo Gwang-jin (Ep. 1)
An actor who is caught up in a dating scandal with Ha-jin after a paparazzo takes a picture of them in the parking lot of Gwang-jin's building.
 Rowoon as Joo Yeo-min (Ep. 1)
An idol who is caught up in a dating scandal with Ha-jin after a paparazzo takes a picture of them in Yeo-min's car.
 Yura as herself (Ep. 2 & 4)
An actress who often bullied Ha-jin while working with her. 
 Hong Yoon-hwa as herself (Ep. 4)
A reporter from Section TV Entertainment News who does a street interview with Ha-jin about her upcoming film My First Love.
 Kim Eana as herself (Ep. 5)
Host of the radio show Nighttime Letters who interviews Ha-jin about her film My First Love.
 Shin Dong-mi as Writer Hwang (Ep. 11)
A famous screenwriter that Ha-jin admires. She is a fan of Jung-hoon.
 Kim Nam-hui as himself (Ep. 11)
A drama director who works with writer Hwang. He was against Ha-jin's casting.
 Yangpa as herself (Ep. 18)
Radio DJ who receives Ha-jin as a guest.
 Ok Ja-yeon as Ms. Kang (Ep. 30)
A woman suspected of being involved in her husband Shim Jae-chul's murder. She is exposed by Lee Jung-hoon.
 Park Jin-woo as Yang Jin-woo (Ep. 31–32)
A film director who cast Ha-jin as the lead actress in his film Find Me in Your Memory.

Production
The first script reading took place on February 12, 2020.

Original soundtrack

Part 1

Part 2

Part 3

Part 4

Part 5

Ratings
In this table,  represent the lowest ratings and  represent the highest ratings.

Awards and nominations

Notes

References

External links
  
 
 

MBC TV television dramas
Korean-language television shows
2020 South Korean television series debuts
2020 South Korean television series endings
South Korean mystery television series
Television series by Chorokbaem Media